Deepika Prasain (sometimes credited as Deepika Prasai, Nepali: दीपिका प्रसाई, born November 9, 1996 in Dhangadhi, Nepal), also known by her married name Deepika Prasain Bhattarai is an Nepalese film actress. Prasain debuted as an actress from Aishwarya (2017), she rose to fame after her leading role in Chhakka Panja 3 (2018).

Career 
Prasain debuted as an actress from Diwakar Bhattarai's romance drama film Aishwarya (2017) where she appeared in a leading role, which is also comeback film of Nepalese actor Ramesh Upreti. After the success of Aishwarya (2017) she appeared in Chhakka Panja 3 (2018), opposite Deepak Raj Giri. The film became emerging success and broke Nepalese box office records, by becoming highest grossing Nepali film.

Personal life 
Prasain has been married to Nepalese film director Diwakar Bhattarai since October 2018.

Filmography

Awards

References

External links 
 

Living people
Nepalese female models
1996 births
Nepalese film actresses
People from Kailali District
Actresses in Nepali cinema
21st-century Nepalese actresses